Martin William Giles (born 1 January 1979) is an English footballer, who played as a full back in the Football League for Chester City. Giles started his career at West Bromwich Albion before turning professional with Chester. He had brief spells at Telford United and Nantwich Town, and also played semi-pro in the Welsh Premier League for Newtown AFC where he made 91 appearances. Giles also played for Shawbury United in the West Midland Premier Division.

References

Chester City F.C. players
Newtown A.F.C. players
English Football League players
Association football fullbacks
1979 births
Living people
Sportspeople from Shrewsbury
English footballers